George Schlatter (born December 31, 1932) is an American television producer and director, best known for Rowan & Martin's Laugh-In and founder of the American Comedy Awards.

For his work on television, Schlatter has a star on the Hollywood Walk of Fame at 7030 Hollywood Blvd.

Life and career
Schlatter was born in Birmingham, Alabama, and raised in Webster Groves, Missouri, a St. Louis inner-ring suburb. Born the son of a violinist mother and a salesman father. He is Jewish. As a teenager, Schlatter sang for two seasons with the St. Louis Municipal Opera, where his mother also performed. He attended Pepperdine University in Los Angeles, California.

Schlatter was a Hollywood agent in the band and act department of MCA Records. After several years, he left to become general manager at the Sunset Strip nightclub Ciro's. The comedy team of Dan Rowan and Dick Martin performed there. In the early 1960s, following a short stint in Las Vegas, he started producing variety series and specials for television. Between 1964 and 1970, he oversaw the annual telecast of the Grammy Awards. In 1968, he formed George Schlatter Productions, noted for Rowan and Martin's Laugh In on NBC.

In the 1970s and 1980s, Schlatter produced and directed several television series, while continuing to produce variety specials. In 1987, he started "The American Comedy Awards", which was an annual event through 2001. Schlatter also produced a few feature films, and owns The Editing Company, which for many years was one of Hollywood's busiest state-of-the-art post production facilities.

He is married to former actress Jolene Brand who was a regular on several Ernie Kovacs shows of the early 1960s. They have two daughters, Andrea and Maria. Andrea Justine is a champion equestrian rider. Maria S. Schlatter is an Emmy award winning television producer.

Television work
A partial listing of his television achievements follows.

Executive producer

Muhammad Ali's All-Star 60th Birthday Celebration! (2002)
Rowan & Martin's Laugh-In (1968–1972)
Turn-On (1969; unsuccessful)
Arnold's Closet Revue (1971)
Real People (1979)
Goldie and Liza Together (1980)
Annual American Comedy Awards (1987–2001)
A Party for Richard Pryor (1991)
The First Annual Comedy Hall of Fame (1993)
Sinatra: 80 Years My Way (1995)
Caesars Palace 30th Anniversary Celebration (1996)
The American Film Institute Salute to Dustin Hoffman (1999)
The American Film Institute Salute to Harrison Ford (2000)

Producer

Victor Borge's Twentieth Anniversary Special (1961)
The Dinah Shore Chevy Show (1962)
The Judy Garland Show (1963)
The Fabulous Funnies (1968)
The New Bill Cosby Show (1972)
Cher (1975)
John Denver and Friend (1976)
The Shirley MacLaine Special: Where Do We Go from Here? (1977)
The Goldie Hawn Special (1978)
Salute to Lady Liberty (1984)
Las Vegas: An All-Star 75th Anniversary (1987)
Frank, Liza, and Sammy: The Ultimate Event (1989)
Sammy Davis, Jr. 60th Anniversary Celebration (1990)
Muhammad Ali's 50th Birthday Celebration (1992)

Director

The Dinah Shore Special: Like Hep (1969)
Comedy Club (1987)
Frank, Liza, and Sammy: The Ultimate Event (1989)
Rowan & Martin's Laugh-In: 25th Anniversary Reunion (1993)

Filmography
A partial listing of films that he produced and/or directed follows.

Fire and Ice (1987)
Norman... Is That You? (1976)

Awards and honors 
Between 1968 and 1996, Schlatter was nominated for 15 Emmy Awards, winning twice for Rowan & Martin's Laugh-In as Outstanding Musical or Variety Program (1968) and for Sammy Davis, Jr. 60th Anniversary Celebration as Outstanding Variety, Music or Comedy Special (1990). He was also nominated for a Writers Guild of America award in 1997. For his work on television, Schlatter has a star on the Hollywood Walk of Fame at 7030 Hollywood Blvd.

References

External links

 

1932 births
American television directors
20th-century American Jews
Emmy Award winners
Living people
Businesspeople from Birmingham, Alabama
People from St. Louis
People from Webster Groves, Missouri
21st-century American Jews
Television producers from Missouri